On Sunday, September 30, 1984, Mike Witt of the California Angels threw a perfect game against the Texas Rangers at Arlington Stadium. It was the 11th perfect game in Major League Baseball history.

Witt's perfect game came on the last day of the 1984 MLB season. As the Angels and Rangers had been eliminated from the playoffs, only 8,375 fans attended the game. Witt was opposed by Charlie Hough of the Rangers, who allowed only one run to the Angels.

Reggie Jackson, whose seventh-inning fielder's choice ground ball scored Doug DeCinces for the game's only run, was also on the winning end of Catfish Hunter's perfect game while with the Oakland Athletics in 1968, becoming the first player to play for the winning team in two perfect games. 

Mickey Rivers, the Rangers designated hitter who batted leadoff, played in this his final major league game.

Witt also struck out 10 batters during the game. With the win, the Angels finished .500, which they had not done since the 1982 season. Two years later, they would reach the ALCS but lose. The Rangers would have to wait ten years for their perfect game, which they did fittingly enough against the Angels. That game took place in Arlington Stadium's successor, The Ballpark in Arlington.

Boxscore

References

1984 Major League Baseball season
Major League Baseball perfect games
California Angels
Texas Rangers (baseball)
20th century in Arlington, Texas
1984 in sports in Texas
September 1984 sports events in the United States
Sports competitions in Texas